Mehmed "Meho" Kodro (born 12 January 1967) is a Bosnian professional football manager and former player who played as a forward.

He spent most of his 16-year senior career in Spain, mostly with Real Sociedad (four seasons) and Tenerife (three), amassing La Liga totals of 263 matches and 105 goals. He possessed good technical skills, and was equally adept in the air.

After retiring, Kodro started a managerial career.

Club career
Born in Mostar, Socialist Republic of Bosnia and Herzegovina, Socialist Federal Republic of Yugoslavia, Kodro's professional debut occurred in 1985 at the age of 18 with hometown club FK Velež. He appeared in only 14 Yugoslav First League games in his first two years but eventually became a starter, scoring a total of 31 goals in his last two full seasons and helping his team win the 1986 edition of the Yugoslav Cup – he did not play in the final against GNK Dinamo Zagreb however – and three consecutive top-three finishes.

When the Yugoslav Wars began, Kodro migrated to Spain – after scoring five goals in only five matches in the last edition of the Yugoslavian championship – where he spent the vast majority of his remaining career. He first played with Real Sociedad of San Sebastián, always netting in double digits for the Basques, including 23 in 1993–94 and a career-best 25 in the following year (including a hat-trick in the Basque derby) and finishing second in the Pichichi Trophy race to Real Madrid's Iván Zamorano.

Kodro was purchased by FC Barcelona in the 1995 off-season, starting throughout most of the campaign but only managing nine La Liga goals for the Catalans, including two in the El Clásico against Real Madrid (3–0 home win). After Barça came out empty in silverware, manager Johan Cruyff – who insisted in his signing – was dismissed and the player also left Camp Nou, signing with CD Tenerife where he played three seasons, notably contributing two goals from eight appearances in the Canary Islands side's semi-final run in the UEFA Cup. In 1998–99, for the only time in his career, he failed to find the net and his team suffered top-flight relegation.

32-year-old Kodro returned to the Basque region in the summer of 1999, joining Deportivo Alavés on loan for the 1999–2000 campaign. He retired from football the following year after one year in Israel with Maccabi Tel Aviv FC.

International career
Kodro earned two caps for Yugoslavia, his debut coming on 4 September 1991 in a 4–3 friendly loss against Sweden. In the late 90s and early 2000s he played 13 times with Bosnia and Herzegovina, appearing in six 1998 FIFA World Cup qualification games and scoring in a 2–1 away victory over Slovenia.

Coaching career
Kodro started working as a manager in 2006, being assistant to José Mari Bakero at former club Real Sociedad. On 5 January 2008, he was appointed head coach of Bosnia and Herzegovina, accepting the job after the Football Association met his conditions, which were to allow him to continue living in San Sebastián and to guarantee him full independence in football matters. Things quickly went sour, however: he led the side in two friendlies before refusing to take charge of the team for a game against Iran scheduled for 26 May in Tehran, arranged by the federation without his knowledge; as a result, he was sacked on 17 May.

In the summer of 2008, Kodro was appointed manager of the youth sides. He remained in the post for two years when he was promoted to B-team duties, as they competed in Segunda División B.

In the following years, Kodro was in charge of FK Sarajevo in the Bosnian Premier League and Swiss Super League club Servette FC. On 4 June 2020, he signed as new coach of FC Stade Lausanne Ouchy in the latter country's Challenge League.

Personal life
Kodro's son, Kenan, is also a professional footballer and a forward. He was coached by his father at Real Sociedad B for two years. They became the first son and father to represent Bosnia and Herzegovina internationally.

Career statistics

International goals
Scores and results list Bosnia and Herzegovina's goal tally first, score column indicates score after each Kodro goal.

Managerial statistics

Honours

Player
Velež Mostar
Yugoslav Cup: 1985–86; runner-up 1988–89
	
Barcelona	
Copa del Rey runner-up: 1995–96

Maccabi Tel Aviv
Israel State Cup: 2000–01

Individual
Awards
Bosnian Footballer of the Year: 1996, 1997

References

External links

National team data 

1967 births
Living people
Bosniaks of Bosnia and Herzegovina
Sportspeople from Mostar
Yugoslav footballers
Bosnia and Herzegovina footballers
Association football forwards
Yugoslav First League players
FK Velež Mostar players
La Liga players
Real Sociedad footballers
FC Barcelona players
CD Tenerife players
Deportivo Alavés players
Israeli Premier League players
Maccabi Tel Aviv F.C. players
Yugoslavia international footballers
Bosnia and Herzegovina international footballers
Dual internationalists (football)
Yugoslav expatriate footballers
Bosnia and Herzegovina expatriate footballers
Expatriate footballers in Spain
Expatriate footballers in Israel
Yugoslav expatriate sportspeople in Spain
Bosnia and Herzegovina expatriate sportspeople in Spain
Bosnia and Herzegovina expatriate sportspeople in Israel
Bosnia and Herzegovina football managers
Segunda División B managers
Real Sociedad B managers
Premier League of Bosnia and Herzegovina managers
FK Sarajevo managers
Swiss Super League managers
Swiss Challenge League managers
Servette FC managers
FC Stade Lausanne Ouchy managers
Bosnia and Herzegovina national football team managers
Expatriate football managers in Spain
Expatriate football managers in Switzerland
Bosnia and Herzegovina expatriate sportspeople in Switzerland